Moses Lake High School is a public high school in Moses Lake, Washington serving 2,417 students in grades 9–12.

The current principal is Sheila Kries.

Demographics
51% of those who attend the high school are white, while 45% are Hispanic. 1% are black, 1.6% are Asian or Pacific Islander, 1.1% are American Indian or Alaska native, and 2% are of two or more races. 58% of those who attend the school are from economically disadvantaged families.

Clubs and organizations 
Source:

 Anime Club
AVID
Band
Choir
 Culinary
 Drama Club
 FFA
 Floral
 GSA (Gay-Straight Alliance)
 History of Fashion Through Film
 Jewelry Club
Key Club
 Knowledge Bowl
 Link Crew
 Math Club
 MECHA Club
 Mu Alpha Theta Math Honor Society
 National Honor Society
 ORCA Bowl
 Photography Club
 Promise for Tomorrow
Science Olympiad
 Skills USA
 Table Top Club
Thespian Troupe
 Youth Action Team

Sports 

 Male:
 Football
 Cross Country
 Basketball
 Swim & Dive
 Wrestling
 Baseball
 Golf
 Soccer
 Tennis
 Track
 Female:
 Softball; Slow Pitch
 Swim & Dive
 Volleyball
 Cross Country
 Cheer
 Drill
 Basketball
 Bowling
 Wrestling
 Softball; Fast Pitch
 Golf
 Tennis
 Track
 Unified:
 Basketball
 Soccer

Rankings
This school is rated below average in school quality compared to other schools in the state. Students here perform below average on state tests, and have average college readiness measures. Large disparities in absenteeism and suspension rates exist at this school, which is concerning. Only 38% on average pass the math test scores with a pass, while 51% on average pass the test in Washington State.

History 

Moses Lake High School Started in 1924. The First Graduate was Ed Hull. The original name of MLHS in 1924 was Neppel School. Classes were held in a four-room building at the site of the present day Rite-Aid

In 1946 a new larger building was built. The first Principal was Ray Darnall (1913-1980). He served from 1946-1948. In 1948 Darnall worked as a basketball coach.

In 1947 Vern Taylor was killed during a construction accident.

 Ray Darnall 1946-1948
 Osmond Darling 1948-1951
 Robert C Smith 1951-1955
 Winifield Fountain 1955-1957
 John Lothespich 1957-1961
 Delbert Milholland 1961-1971
 Frank Kelly 1971-1973
 Marr Marchbank 1973-1975
 Lee Hutsell 1975-1979
 Thomas Oxwang 1979-1981
 Larry Smith 1981-2000
 Dave Balcom 2000-2009
 Dr. Joshua Meek 2009-2015
 Mark Harris 2015-2017
 Jake Long 2017-Spring 2019
 Triscia Hochstatter Fall 2019–2021
 Sheila Kries 2021-Present

1959: New campus 

In the Spring of 1959, Moses Lake High School moved locations. That building is currently Frontier Middle School.

The New Location had 7 different buildings.

The Hallways were arranged A, B, C, D, E, F and G. The J building was added in 1962-63.

The Principals who served during the era was

 John Lothespich
 Delbert Millholand
 Marr Marchbank
 Frank Kelly
 Lee Hutsell
 Tom Oxwang
 Larry Smith

1995–1997: Modernization 

In 1995 the high school was modernized with the following:

 Connecting the nine detached buildings
 Removal of lockers
 Adding two new gyms.

2022: Rebranding 

April 2021, Washington Legislature passed House Bill 1356 prohibiting the inappropriate use of Native American names, symbols, or images as public school mascots, logos, or team names without tribal consent. In February, 2022, the Confederated Tribes of the Colville Reservation revoked the use of the 'Chiefs' mascot for Moses Lake High School in addition to the 'Braves' at Columbia Middle School (formerly Chief Moses Middle School) and the 'Warriors' at Frontier Middle School in Moses Lake. Moses Lake High School began the rebranding process in 2022. With student, staff, and community involvement, the 'Mavericks' was selected as the new mascot.

References

High schools in Grant County, Washington
Public high schools in Washington (state)
Moses Lake, Washington